This list of museums in Dorset, England contains museums which are defined for this context as institutions (including nonprofit organizations, government entities, and private businesses) that collect and care for objects of cultural, artistic, scientific, or historical interest and make their collections or related exhibits available for public viewing. Also included are non-profit art galleries and university art galleries.  Museums that exist only in cyberspace (i.e., virtual museums) are not included.

Defunct museums
 Discovery, interactive hands-on science exhibits, formerly part of Brewers Quay
 Museum of Electricity, Christchurch, closed indefinitely in 2012
 Timewalk, formerly located in Brewers Quay, exhibits on 600 years of local history and the brewing heritage of the building. Closed in 2010.

See also
 :Category:Tourist attractions in Dorset

References

 Dorset for You: Museums
 Dorset Museums Association

 
Dorset
Museums